Akeu is a Loloish language mainly spoken in Jinghong and Mengla County, China, with smaller populations of speakers in Burma, Laos, and Thailand. Gokhy may be related.

Distribution
Akeu (Ake 阿克; autonym: Gouke 勾克) is spoken in the following locations of Yunnan (You 2013:172). The Akeu migrated from Mojiang County to the Xishuangbanna (西双版纳, Sipsongpanna) area 8 generations ago (about 300 years ago).

Ganlanba 橄榄坝, Menghan Township 勐罕镇, Jinghong City 景洪市;
Menglong Township 勐龙镇, Jinghong City 景洪市;
Sanda Mountain 三达山, Jinghong City 景洪市;
Menglun Township 勐仑镇, Mengla County 勐腊县;
Yiwu District 易武乡, Mengla County 勐腊县.

Dialects
The Akeu dialects of Kyaingtong, Myanmar and Menglun 勐仑镇, Mengla County, China are similar. The following words from these two Akeu dialects are from Hayashi (2015).

Vocabulary
The Akeu numerals are:

References

Southern Loloish languages
Languages of Myanmar
Languages of China
Languages of Laos